"Laffy Taffy" is a 2005 song by Atlanta-based hip hop group D4L which reached number one on the Billboard Hot 100 in January 2006. The song's success on the charts was largely due to its enormous online sales. The music video version of the song samples and interpolates elements of "Candy Girl" by New Edition, whereas the CD single version of the song excludes the sampling. The song was produced by Born Immaculate, Broderick Thompson Smith and "K-Rab", and the music video was directed by Thomas Forbes.

Criticism 
During "The Champ" from 2006's Fishscale, Ghostface Killah asks "My arts is crafty darts/ while y'all stuck on Laffy Taffy/Wondering, how'd y'all niggas get past me?" Ghostface had mocked the "snap dance" during his 2005 tour. There has also been controversy on who wrote "Laffy Taffy". Rapper Liam "Smack Eyes" Thomas claims that the group had stolen the lyrics from his rhyme book.

Charts

Weekly charts

Year-end charts

Certifications

See also 
 List of Hot 100 number-one singles of 2006 (U.S.)

References 

2005 songs
2005 debut singles
D4L songs
Snap songs
Billboard Hot 100 number-one singles
Warner Music Group singles
Hip hop dance